Die Anwälte is a German television series about a law firm in Hamburg, broadcast on RTL since 17 January 2008.

See also
 List of German television series

External links

References 

German drama television series
2008 German television series debuts
2008 German television series endings
RTL (German TV channel) original programming
German legal television series
German-language television shows